Peter McKinley (born  1811) was a Michigan politician.

Early life
McKinley was born around 1811 in New York.

Career
McKinley was a farmer. On November 4, 1856, McKinley was elected to the Michigan House of Representatives where he represented the Manitou County district from January 7, 1857 to December 31, 1860. During his second term, he served on the Rules and Joint Rules committee and the House of Correction committee.

Personal life
McKinley lived in St. James, Michigan on Beaver Island.

References

1810s births
Year of death missing
Members of the Michigan House of Representatives
People from Charlevoix County, Michigan
People from New York (state)
19th-century American politicians